The ROH World Tag Team Championship is a professional wrestling world tag team championship contested for in the American professional wrestling promotion Ring of Honor. The championship is generally contested in professional wrestling matches, in which participants usually execute scripted finishes rather than contend in direct competition. 

The Briscoe Brothers (Jay Briscoe & Mark Briscoe) were the most recent champions, however Jay died in a car accident on January 17, 2023.  The titles were formally vacated on March 8, 2023 on AEW Rampage (aired March 10), with new champions to be crowned in a Reach For the Sky ladder match on March 31, 2023 at Supercard of Honor

History
The ROH Tag Team Championship was introduced at Unscripted on September 21, 2002, where ROH held a tournament to crown the first champions. At the time, ROH did not have title belts, and instead presented Christopher Daniels & Donovan Morgan, the winners of the tournament, with a trophy.

The title became the ROH World Tag Team Championship after then champions Austin Aries & Roderick Strong defeated Naruki Doi & Masato Yoshino on July 9, 2006, while on a tour in Japan with Dragon Gate and Pro Wrestling Noah. Since then, the title has also been defended in the United Kingdom.

Since originating in 2002, the title belts were redesigned in 2003, 2005, 2010, 2012, and 2018. On April 1, 2022, at Supercard of Honor XV, the 2005 design returned as the official ROH World Tag Team Championship belts.

Inaugural championship tournament (2002)
Teams:
Da Hit Squad (Mafia & Monsta Mack)
Divine Storm (Chris Divine & Quiet Storm)
The Full Blooded Italians (James Maritato & Tony Mamaluke)
The Natural Born Sinners (Boogalou & Homicide)
The Prophecy (Christopher Daniels & Donovan Morgan)
The S.A.T. (Joel Maximo & Jose Maximo)
American Dragon & Michael Modest
Dick Togo & Ikuto Hidaka

Source:

Belt designs

Reigns

Overall, there have been 64 reigns among 65 different wrestlers and 38 different teams. The inaugural champions were The Prophecy (Christopher Daniels & Donovan Morgan), who defeated "The American Dragon" & Michael Modest on September 21, 2002, to become the champions. The team of Jay Lethal & Jonathan Gresham have the longest reign as champions with their first reign lasting 441 days. The Briscoes (Jay Briscoe & Mark Briscoe) hold the record for the most reigns with 13 (both as a team and individually).

The titles are currently vacant. The Briscoe Brothers (Jay Briscoe & Mark Briscoe) had been the most recent champions. Following Jay's death in a car accident on January 17, 2023, The Briscoes continued to be recognized as champions until March 8, 2023, when on Rampage, Mark formally vacated the titles, with new champions to be crowned in a Reach For the Sky ladder match at Supercard of Honor on March 31, 2023. (aired March 10).

References

External links
 ROH World Tag Team Title History at Cagematch.net

Ring of Honor championships
Tag team wrestling championships
World professional wrestling championships